Nichan Iftikhar may refer to one of the following orders:

Order of Glory (Ottoman Empire)
Order of Glory (Tunisia)